Pyotr Valerievich Dubrov (born 30 January 1978) is a Russian engineer and cosmonaut selected by Roscosmos in 2012.

Early life and education
Dubrov was born on 30 January 1978 in Khabarovsk, Russia SFSR. He attended secondary school No. 13 of Khabarovsk and went on to study at Khabarovsk State Technical University, graduating in 1999 with a degree in Software for Computer Engineering and Automated Systems. After graduating he went on to work as a senior software engineer at CBOSS Development International LLC.

Cosmonaut career
Dubrov was selected by Roscosmos as a cosmonaut on 8 October 2012, as one of eight cosmonauts selected as part of Roscosmos's 2012 selection group. Included in his group was Anna Kikina, one of very few female cosmonauts selected by the agency.

Dubrov and his seven group mates began training at the Yuri Gagarin Cosmonaut Training Center on 29 October 2012. From February 4 to 6, 2013, he participated in winter survival training alongside cosmonauts Anna Kikina and Oleg Blinov, training for an unlikely emergency Soyuz landing in which rescue crews are not able to reach the spacecraft for several days. He graduated from cosmonaut training on 15 July 2014.

In 2020 he was assigned to the backup crew of Soyuz MS-17, backing up Russian cosmonaut Sergey Kud-Sverchkov as Flight Engineer on ISS Expedition 63/64. Amidst the COVID-19 pandemic, he traveled to the Johnson Space Center in Houston, Texas for training on the ISS USOS.

Expedition 64/65/66
Dubrov launched aboard Soyuz MS-18 in April 2021 for his first long duration mission aboard the International Space Station.  He returned to Earth along with Mark T. Vande Hei with Soyuz MS-19 on March 30, 2022, having spent a total of 355 days in space.

Cinematography
On May 14, 2021, the Interagency Committee approved the composition of the ISS main and alternate crews for the period 2021–2023. Cosmonaut Anton Shkaplerov (commander) and the crew of the film The Challenge: actress Yulia Peresild and director Klim Shipenko, will go to the ISS on the Soyuz MS-19. The drama is a joint project of Roscosmos, Channel One and the Yellow, Black and White studio. The alternates chosen after passing the medical committee are: New Drama Theater actress Alyona Mordovina, director Alexey Dudin and the commander Oleg Artemyev. Since May 24 the crew members have been training at the Yuri Gagarin Cosmonaut Training Center. On July 23, the prime crew participated in a four-hour simulation inside a Soyuz replica while wearing the Sokol suit and on July 30, the spacecraft had its pre-launch preparation started.

The director and actress returned to Earth on October 17, 2021, on Soyuz MS-18, with Commander Oleg Novitsky. Cosmonaut Pyotr Dubrov and astronaut Mark Vande Hei, who arrived at the ISS on Soyuz MS-18, joined Shkaplerov on the landing of Soyuz MS-19, on March 30, 2022.

Movie portion shot on ISS
Klim Shipenko shot about 35–40 minutes of film on the ISS, as well as taking on the position of director, operator, art director, and makeup artist. Oleg Novitsky and Pyotr Dubrov will appear in the film, with Dubrov and Mark Vande Hei assisting in the production. Shkaplerov will appear in some scenes of the movie.

References

1978 births
Living people
People from Khabarovsk
Russian cosmonauts
Russian software engineers
Spacewalkers